Sedeh (also known as Seh Deh) is a village in the Central District of Khonj County, Fars Province, Iran. At the 2016 census, its population was 2137, in 548 families.

References 

Populated places in Khonj County